Hanburun is a village in the District of Balâ, Ankara Province, Turkey. The village is populated by Kurds.

References

Villages in Balâ District

Kurdish settlements in Ankara Province